The Toyota Paseo (known as the  in Japan and other regions) is a sports-styled subcompact car sold from 1991 until 1999 by Toyota and was directly based on the Tercel. It was available as a coupé and in later models as a convertible. Toyota stopped selling the car in the United States in 1997, however the car continued to be sold in Canada, Europe and Japan until 1999. The Paseo, like the Tercel, shares a platform with the Starlet. Several parts are interchangeable between the three.

The name "Paseo" is Spanish for "a walk" or "a stroll", while the name "Cynos" is a coined word taken from "cynosure", meaning "the target of attention". In Japan it was exclusive to Toyopet Store locations.



First generation (L40; 1991) 

The first-generation Paseo was made from 1991 until 1995. Based on the L40 series Tercel, it is powered by a 1.5-liter 5E-FE inline-four engine. It was offered with either a 5-speed manual or a 4-speed automatic transmission.

In Japan, the Cynos was available in α (Alpha) and β (Beta) trim levels. The α trim is powered by a 5E-FE engine producing , while the β trim is powered by a 5E-FHE engine producing . In β trim, four-wheel disc brakes and TEMS electronically controlled suspension can be selected as options.

Second generation (L50; 1995) 

The second-generation Paseo was introduced in Japan in 1995, and for the 1996 model year in North America. Apart from some modernizing in the engine electronics, the only noticeable change was in the body sheet metal. A convertible model was shown at the October 1995 Tokyo Motor Show and was released for sale in August 1996. 1996 was the last year the Paseo was sold in the United States (for the 1997 model year).

The second-generation Paseo was sold in the United Kingdom from 1996 to 1998, but was withdrawn due to slow sales. The UK market Paseo was offered in three trim levels: the base ST, the Si; adding 14-inch alloy wheels, a Sony CD player, color-coded boot spoiler with third brake light and an anti-lock braking system, and the Galliano, adding a color-coded chin spoiler, mud guards and yellow paintwork with aquamarine decals on the bodysides, as well as wider 15-inch alloy wheels with low-profile 195/50 tires. The convertible model was not offered. All UK models came with the 5E-FE engine producing .

The Japanese market version was again named "Cynos". Three trim levels were available: α, α Juno Package and β. All came with color-coded wing mirrors and a rear windscreen wiper. The models differed in their dashboards, interior upholstery, steering wheels and engines. The Juno trim came with a 1.3 L 4E-FE engine with a 4-speed automatic transmission. The α trim had the 1.5 L 5E-FE engine with a 5-speed manual transmission and the β trim came with a 5E-FHE engine, also with a 5-speed manual transmission.

Both the Paseo and Cynos were discontinued in 1999.

References 

Paseo
Cars introduced in 1991
Coupés
Convertibles
Front-wheel-drive vehicles
Sport compact cars